Junius M. Emerson (June 23, 1926 – April 23, 1992) was a Democratic member of the Pennsylvania House of Representatives.
 He served in the 82nd Airborne.

References

Democratic Party members of the Pennsylvania House of Representatives
1926 births
1992 deaths
20th-century American politicians